The Kipchaks or Qipchaks, also known as  Kipchak Turks or Polovtsians, were a Turkic nomadic people and confederation that existed in the Middle Ages, inhabiting parts of the Eurasian Steppe. First mentioned in the 8th century as part of the Second Turkic Khaganate, they most likely inhabited the Altai region from where they expanded over the following centuries, first as part of the Kimek Khanate and later as part of a confederation with the Cumans. There were groups of Kipchaks in the Pontic–Caspian steppe, China, Syr Darya and Siberia. The Cuman–Kipchak confederation was conquered by the Mongols in the early 13th century.

Terminology
The Kipchaks interpreted their name as meaning "hollow tree" (cf. Middle Turkic: kuv ağaç); according to them, inside a hollow tree, their original human ancestress gave birth to her son. Németh points to the Siberian qıpčaq "angry, quick-tempered" attested only in the Siberian Sağay dialect (a dialect of Khakas language). Klyashtorny links Kipchak to qovı, qovuq "unfortunate, unlucky"; yet Golden sees a better match in qıv "good fortune" and adjectival suffix -čāq. Regardless, Golden notes that the ethnonym's original form and etymology "remain a matter of contention and speculation".

History

In the Kipchak steppe, a complex ethnic assimilation and consolidation process took place between the 11th and 13th centuries. The western Kipchak tribes absorbed people of Oghuz, Pecheneg, ancient Bashkir, Bulgar and other origin; the eastern Kipchak merged with the Kimek, Karluk, Kara-Khitai and others. They were all identified by the ethnonym Kipchak. Groups and tribes of possible Mongolic or para-Mongolic extraction were also incorporated into the eastern Kipchak conglomerate. Peter Golden argues that the Ölberli were pushed westwards due to socio-political changes among the para-Mongolic Khitans, such as the collapse of the Liao dynasty and formation of the Qara Khitai, and attached themselves to the eastern Kipchak confederation where they eventually came to form a part of the ruling strata and elite. Golden identifies the Ölberli with the Qay whom are recorded as the Xi in Chinese sources and Tatabı in Turkic inscriptions, and were of Mongolic or para-Mongolic background - likely stemming from the Xianbei.

Chinese histories only mentioned the Kipchaks a few times: for example, Yuan general Tutuha's origin from Kipchak tribe Ölberli, or some information about the Kipchaks' homeland, horses, and the Kipchaks' physiognomy and psychology.

The Kipchaks were first unambiguously mentioned in Persian geographer ibn Khordadbeh's Book of Roads and Kingdoms as a northernly Turkic tribe, after Toquz Oghuz, Karluks, Kimeks, Oghuz, J.f.r (either corrupted from Jikil or representing Majfar for Majğar), Pechenegs, Türgesh, Aðkiš, and before Yenisei Kirghiz. Kipchaks possibly appeared in the 8th-century Moyun Chur inscription as Türk-Qïbchaq, mentioned as having been part of the Turkic Khaganate for fifty years; even so, this attestation is uncertain as damages on the inscription leave only -čq (𐰲𐰴) (*-čaq or čiq) readable. It is unclear if the Kipchaks could be identified with, according to Klyashtorny, the [Al]tï Sir in the Orkhon inscriptions (薛延陀; pinyin: Xuè-Yántuó), or with the Juéyuèshī (厥越失) in Chinese sources; however, Zuev (2002) identified 厥越失 Juéyuèshī (< MC *kiwat-jiwat-siet) with toponym Kürüshi in the Ezhim river valley (Ch. Ayan < MCh. 阿豔 *a-iam < OTrk. Ayam) in Tuva Depression. Linguist Bernard Karlgren and some Soviet scholars (e.g. Lev Gumilyov) attempted to connect the Kipchaks to the Qūshé ~ Qūshí (屈射), a people once conquered by the Xiongnu; however, Golden deems this connection unlikely, considering 屈射's Old Chinese pronunciation *khut m-lak and Eastern Han Chinese *kʰut źa ~ kʰut jak/jɑk (as reconstructed by Schuessler, 2009:314,70). The relationship between the Kipchaks and Cumans is unclear.

While part of the Turkic Khaganate, they most likely inhabited the Altai region. When the Khaganate collapsed, they became part of the Kimek confederation, with which they expanded to the Irtysh, Ishim and Tobol rivers. They then appeared in Islamic sources. In the 9th century Ibn Khordadbeh indicated that they held autonomy within the Kimek confederation. They entered the Kimek in the 8th- or beginning of 9th century, and were one of seven original tribes. In the 10th-century Hudud al-'Alam it is said that the Kimek appointed the Kipchak king. The Kimek confederation, probably spearheaded by the Kipchaks, moved into Oghuz lands, and Sighnaq in Syr Darya became the Kipchak urban centre. Kipchak remnants remained in Siberia, while others pushed westwards in the Qun migration. As a result, three Kipchak groups emerged:
Kipchaks of the Pontic–Caspian steppe.
Kipchaks of the Syr Darya, associated with the Khwarazmian dynasty.
Kipchaks of Siberia, later composing the Siberian Tatars.

The early 11th century saw a massive Turkic nomadic migration towards the Islamic world. The first waves were recorded in the Kara-Khanid Khanate in 1017–18. It is unknown whether the Cumans conquered the Kipchaks or were simply the leaders of the Kipchak–Turkic tribes. By the 12th century, the two separate confederations of Cumans and Kipchaks merged.

The Mongols defeated the Alans after convincing the Kipchaks to desert them through pointing at their likeness in language and culture. Nonetheless, the Kipchaks were defeated next. Under khan Köten, Kipchaks fled to the Principality of Kiev (the Ruthenians), where the Kipchaks had several marriage relations, one of which was Köten's son-in-law Mstislav Mstislavich of Galicia. The Ruthenians and Kipchaks forged an alliance against the Mongols, and met at the Dnieper to locate them. After an eight-day pursuit, they met at the Kalka River (1223). The Kipchaks, who were horse archers like the Mongols, served as the vanguard and scouts. The Mongols, who appeared to retreat, tricked the Ruthenian–Kipchak force into a trap after suddenly emerging behind the hills and surrounding them. The fleeing Kipchaks were closely pursued, and the Ruthenian camp was massacred.

The nomadic Kipchaks were the main targets of the Mongols when they crossed the Volga in 1236. The defeated Kipchaks mainly entered the Mongol ranks, while others fled westward. Köten led 40,000 families into Hungary, where King Bela IV granted them refuge in return for their Christianization. The refugee Kipchaks fled Hungary after Köten was murdered.

After their fall, Kipchaks and Cumans were known to have become mercenaries in Europe and taken as slave warriors. In Egypt, the Mamluks were in part drawn from Kipchaks and Cumans.

Language
The Kipchak–Cuman confederation spoke a Turkic language. Mongolian linguistic elements in the Kipchak–Kimek confederation remain "unproven", though that confederation's constituent Tatar tribe were possibly Turkified Mongolic speakers.

Kipchaks and Cumans spoke a Turkic language (Kipchak language, Cuman language) whose most important surviving record is the Codex Cumanicus, a late 13th-century dictionary of words in Kipchak, Cuman, and Latin. The presence in Egypt of Turkic-speaking Mamluks also stimulated the compilation of Kipchak/Cuman-Arabic dictionaries and grammars that are important in the study of several old Turkic languages.

When members of the Armenian diaspora moved from the Crimean peninsula to the Polish-Ukrainian borderland, at the end of the 13th century, they brought Kipchak, their adopted Turkic language, with them. During the 16th and the 17th centuries, the Turkic language among the Armenian communities of the Kipchak people was Armeno-Kipchak. They were settled in the Lviv and Kamianets-Podilskyi areas of what is now Ukraine.

The Cuman language became extinct in the 18th century in the region of Cumania in Hungary, which was its last stronghold.

Religion
The Kipchaks practiced Tengrism. Muslim conversion occurred near Islamic centres.
Some Kipchaks and Cumans were known to have converted to Christianity around the 11th century, at the suggestion of the Georgians, as they allied in their conflicts against the Muslims. A great number were baptized at the request of Georgian King David IV, who also married a daughter of Kipchak Khan Otrok. From 1120, there was a Kipchak national Christian church and an important clergy. Following the Mongol conquest, Islam rose in popularity among the Kipchaks of the Golden Horde.

Culture

Kurgan stelae

Confederations

Kimek
 
The confederation or tribal union which Kipchaks entered in the 8th- or beginning of 9th century as one of seven original tribes is known in historiography as that of the Kimek (or Kimäk). Turkic inscriptions do not mention the state with that name. 10th-century Hudud al-'Alam mentions the "country of Kīmāk", ruled by a khagan (king) who has eleven lieutenants that hold hereditary fiefs. Furthermore, Andar Az Khifchāq is mentioned as a country (nāḥiyat) of the Kīmāk, 'of which inhabitants resemble the Ghūz in some customs'.

In the 9th century Ibn Khordadbeh indicated that they held autonomy within the Kimek confederation. They entered the Kimek in the 8th- or beginning of 9th century, and were one of the seven original tribes. In the 10th-century's Hudud al-'Alam it is said that the Kimek appointed the Kipchak king.

Physical appearance
An early description of the physical appearance of Kipchaks comes from the Great Ming Code, the supreme legal code of the Ming dynasty of China, which was finalized in the year 1397 AD. The Great Ming Code enforced consentual marriage between Chinese, Mongol and semu ren people. However, the law made an exemption stating that the Kipchaks and Han Chinese were not required to marry each other. 

The Kipchaks are described as having blond or red hair, blue or green eyes<ref> ""....Qincha have yellow hair and blue eyes' (Ming Lu Ji Jue Fu Li, Vol. 6, 1969 copy)."</ref> and an overall appearance that was considered "vile" and just too foreign. Han Chinese were not attracted to those features.

Thus, Kipchaks were not obligated to marry Chinese:

The 17th century Chinese author Xu Qianxue, wrote of the Kipchaks:

 Genetics 
Russian anthropologist Oshanin (1964: 24, 32) notes that the ‘Mongoloid’ phenotype, characteristic of modern Kipchak-speaking Kazakhs and Qirghiz, prevails among the skulls of the historical Qipchaq and Pecheneg nomads found across Central Asia and Ukraine; Lee & Kuang (2017) propose that Oshanin's discovery is explainable by assuming that the historical Kipchaks' modern descendants are Kazakhs, whose men possess a high frequency of haplogroup C2's subclade C2b1b1 (59.7 to 78%). 

Lee and Kuang also suggest that the high frequency (63.9%) of the Y-DNA haplogroup R-M73 among Karakypshaks (a tribe within the Kipchaks) allows inference about the genetics of Karakypshaks' medieval ancestors, thus explaining why some medieval Kipchaks were described as possessing "blue [or green] eyes and red hair.

A genetic study published in Nature in May 2018 examined the remains of two Kipchak males buried between c. 1000 AD and 1200 AD. One male was found to the a carrier of the paternal haplogroup C and the maternal haplogroup F1b1b, and displayed "increased East Asian ancestry". The other male was found to be a carrier of the maternal haplogroup D4 and displayed "pronounced European ancestry".

Legacy
Kipchak peoples and languages

The modern Northwestern branch of the Turkic languages is often referred to as the Kipchak branch. The languages in this branch are mostly considered to be descendants of the Kipchak language, and the people who speak them may likewise be referred to as Kipchak peoples. Some of the groups traditionally included are the Karachays, Siberian Tatars, Nogays, Bashkirs, Kazakhs, Kyrgyz, Volga Tatars, and Crimean Tatars. There is also a village named Kipchak in Crimea. Qypshaq, which is a development of "Kipchak" in the Kazakh language, is one of the constituent tribes of the Middle Horde confederation of the Kazakh people. The name Kipchak also occurs as a surname in Kazakhstan. Some of the descendants of the Kipchaks are the Bashkirian clan Qipsaq.

Notable people
Kipchak confederations
Ayyub Khan ( 1117), Kipchak leader
Bačman ( 1229–1236), Kipchak leader in the Lower Volga
Qačir-üküle ( 1236), Kipchak leader in the Lower Volga
Köten ( 1223–1239), Kipchak leader

Kipchak ancestry
Al-Mansur Qalawun, Mamluk sultan of Egypt (r. 1279–1290)
Baibars, Mamluk sultan of Egypt (r. 1260–1277)
Faris ad-Din Aktai, Mamluk emir
Nasir ad-Din Qabacha, Mamluk Sultan of Multan

See also
 
 Afghan Kypchaks
 Nağaybäk
 History of the central steppe

Notes

References

Sources
 
 
 
 
 
 
 
 
 
 
 

Further reading
 "Kipchak" Encyclopædia Britannica, Academic Edition. 2006.
 "Polovtsi" The Columbia Encyclopedia, Sixth Edition. 2001–2005.
 Boswell, A. Bruce. "The Kipchak Turks." The Slavonic Review 6.16 (1927): 68–85.
 
 Győrfi, Dávid. "Khwarezmian: Mapping the Kipchak component of Pre-Chagatai Turkic." Acta Orientalia 67.4 (2014): 383–406.
 Shanijazov, K. "Early Elements in the Ethnogenesis of the Uzbeks." The Nomadic Alternative: Modes and Models of Interaction in the African-Asian Deserts and Steppes (1978): 147.
 Ushntskiy, Vasiliy V. "KIPCHAK COMPONENT IN THE SAKHA ETHNOGENESIS." VESTNIK TOMSKOGO GOSUDARSTVENNOGO UNIVERSITETA-ISTORIYA 3 (2015): 97–101.
 Mukhajanova, T. N., and A. M. Asetilla. "KIPCHAK" ETHNONYM AND THE HISTORY OF ITS ORIGIN." International Scientific and Practical Conference World science. Vol. 3. No. 12. ROST, 2016.
 Baski, Imre. "On the ethnic names of the Cumans of Hungary." Kinship in the Altaic World. Proceedings of the 48th PIAC (2006): 43–54.
 Róna-Tas, András. "The reconstruction of Proto-Turkic and the genetic question." (1998).
 Biro, M. B. "The «Kipchaks» in the Georgian Martyrdom of David and Constantin." Annales. Sectio linguistics 4 (1973).
 Kadyrbaev, Aleksandr. "Turks (Uighurs, Kipchaks and Kanglis) in the history of the Mongols." Acta Orientalia 58.3 (2005): 249–253.
 Halperin, Charles J. "The Kipchak Connection: The Ilkhans, the Mamluks and Ayn Jalut." Bulletin of the School of Oriental and African Studies 63.2 (2000): 229–245.
 Eckmann, János. "The Mamluk-Kipchak Literature." Central Asiatic Journal (1963): 304–319.
 Csáki, E. (2006). Middle Mongolian loan words in Volga Kipchak languages''. Turcologica, Bd. 67. Wiesbaden: Harrassowitz. 
 Galip Güner (2013), Kıpçak Türkçesi Grameri, Kesit Yayınları, İstanbul.
 
 Hildinger, Erik (1997), Warriors of the Steppe: Military History of Central Asia, 500 BC To 1700 AD. Da Capo Press.
 
 Mustafa Argunşah, Galip Güner (2015), Codex Cumanicus, Kesit Yayınları, İstanbul.

External links

 Codex Cumanicus
 
 Murad ADJI, The Kipchaks

 
Turkic peoples of Europe
Turkic peoples of Asia
Nomadic groups in Eurasia
History of Kievan Rus'
Ethnic groups in Ukraine
Extinct Turkic peoples